Cold Spring Farm, also known as Peter and Louisa Morton Farmstead, is a historic farmstead located in Todd Township, Fulton County, Pennsylvania. The property includes three contributing buildings: the main house (1900), sandstone spring house (c. 1850) with a Queen Anne style second floor addition, and a sandstone slaughterhouse (c. 1850).  The house is a two-story, five bay, brick structure with a cross gable roof and Palladian window.  It features a wraparound porch with wide, overhanging eaves.

It was listed on the National Register of Historic Places in 2000.

References

Houses on the National Register of Historic Places in Pennsylvania
Queen Anne architecture in Pennsylvania
Colonial Revival architecture in Pennsylvania
Houses completed in 1900
Houses in Fulton County, Pennsylvania
National Register of Historic Places in Fulton County, Pennsylvania